"Butterflies and Hurricanes" is a song by English rock band Muse. It was released as the sixth and final single from their third studio album, Absolution (2003), on 20 September 2004. Unlike Absolution, the single was released through Atlantic Records.

The song was one of two songs recorded with a studio orchestra during the initial stages of production. It is also notable for its Rachmaninoff-esque piano interlude. The title and theme were mainly inspired by the butterfly effect of chaos theory. The theory describes how even the smallest of changes in present conditions, like the flapping of a butterfly's wings, can cause a chain reaction and have a significant effect in the future, like a hurricane. The song was also dedicated to Dominic Howard's father, who died shortly after the band's performance at the Glastonbury Festival.

Background and composition 
Some parts of the song have been around at least as early as 1999. Matt Bellamy had suggested a piece featuring the band and an orchestra playing over a "mechanical paradiddle" to Dom Howard, the band's drummer. According to Bellamy the song really took shape when he spent a few hours fiddling around on a Steinway piano he found at a hotel he was staying in:

Matthew Bellamy also declared about the song: "It's about hope, about trying to find the strength to get through any given situation. I was trying to find a classical type of piano style that would be heavy and work with bass and drums. It had that sort of mechanical paradiddle thing all the way through, and then it breaks down into this kind of romantic, flowing weird bit in the middle".

Recording 
There are several versions of "Butterflies and Hurricanes". For the original studio recording, the song's introduction, verse and choruses were harmonically driven by piano and keyboards. The single version contains both guitar and keyboard, but the interlude is slightly shorter, reducing the song from 5:01 to 4:48. The vinyl single includes a full-length version with guitars in the mix. Finally, the radio edit of the single goes further by omitting the entire piano interlude, bringing the song down to 4:10.

Live 
The song was reworked with a more prominent electric guitar sound during the Absolution tour, including some extended guitar solos before the piano interlude (and a bass fill to segue Matt Bellamy's transition from guitar to the piano). This version was also performed live during the Black Holes and Revelations tour, and can be heard in the Wembley Stadium concerts. The song was played at most shows from 2003 to 2008, and made occasional appearances during The Resistance Tour, The 2nd Law Tour, and the Drones World Tour. The song has not been performed since 2017.

Music video
The music comprises stock footage of the band playing "Butterflies and Hurricanes" at different venues during their Absolution tour with some effects added, and images of the Colosseum in Rome serving as the main backdrop.

Media
The song has also been featured in several BBC sports programmes. Most notably an orchestral version of the song was used as the main theme for the BBC's Sports Personality of the year award back in 2005, and also on the BBC's 2010 Six Nations championship coverage. This song is also featured in the introduction sequence of the 2012 video game Need For Speed Most Wanted, as well as Formula One 05.

Track listing

CD
"Butterflies and Hurricanes" (Remix With Additional Guitars Full Length) – 5:02
"Sing for Absolution" (Live Acoustic Radio 2) – 4:28

Clear Vinyl 7"
"Butterflies and Hurricanes" (full length) – 5:01
"Butterflies and Hurricanes" (Glastonbury 2004)

DVD
"Butterflies and Hurricanes" – 4:48
"Butterflies and Hurricanes video" – 4:48
"The Groove in the States video" – 9:51
"Raw video footage"

Promo CD
"Butterflies and Hurricanes" (radio edit) – 4:10
"Butterflies and Hurricanes"

Charts

References

Muse (band) songs
2004 singles
2003 songs
Science fiction music
Mushroom Records singles
Rock ballads
Songs written by Matt Bellamy
Songs written by Dominic Howard
Songs written by Chris Wolstenholme